There is a community of Serbs in Portugal) are Portuguese citizens of Serbian descent or citizens of Serbia who live and work in Portugal. It is estimated that there are about 1,000 Serbs living in Portugal. In southern Portugal, about 30 Serbs live in Algarve.
Since 2017, Serbs have had the Serbian Orthodox Church of the Holy Christ of Salvation in Lisbon.

Notable people

 Jovana Nogić, basketball player.
 Milan Obradović, scientist and writer.
 Ljubomir Stanišić, famous restaurant owner.
 Vladimir Stojković, football player.
 Filip Stanišić, volleyball player, Portuguese representative

See also

Portugal-Serbia relations
Serbian Orthodox Eparchy of Western Europe

References

Literature

External links
 Srbi u Portugaliji (Serbs in Portugal) Facebook page

Portugal–Serbia relations
Ethnic groups in Portugal
Portugal
Portugal
Portugal
Portugal